The FIA Masters Historic Formula One Championship is a championship that has old Formula One cars from "the golden era", which caters for 3-litre engine Formula 1 cars, from 1966 to 1985.

The series grew out of the Grand Prix Masters series (not related or to be confused with the short-lived Grand Prix Masters series, a one-make formula series for retired Formula One drivers), which was an alternative to the FIA Thoroughbred GP car championship. With entries falling in TGP and healthier grid being seen at Grand Prix Masters, the FIA awarded Masters Historic Racing the rights to promote the FIA Masters Historic Formula One Championship from 2013 to the present day.  

Masters Historic Racing is a UK based organisation, headed by race and entrepreneur Ron Maydon, which also operates a number of other historic race categories.

Regulations 

 Cars using Cosworth DFV engines must have an engine limiter of 10,000 rpm
 All cars must be presented with a current FIA Historic Technical Passport and be presented in that specification.
 All drivers must be in possession of an International level racing licence.
 Cars must be classed into the following categories in order to enter a race:
 Jackie Stewart class: Formula One cars built and raced prior to 31 December 1972
 Emerson Fittipaldi class: Post–1972, non-ground effect Formula One cars
 Patrick Head class: Post–1972, ground effect Formula One cars
 Niki Lauda class: Post–1972, flat bottomed Formula One cars
 Characteristics of events:
 Friday: Untimed Practice (If Available)
 Friday: Timed Qualifying
 Saturday: Race 1
 Sunday: Race 2
 At the end of the championship, there will be four winners, one for each of the four classes. 
 Prior to 2020 there were only two champions, Pre and Post 1978, thus combining Stewart and Fittipaldi classes together and the Head and Lauda classes together.
 Points:
 For classes with 3 or more starters in the class: 9–6–4–3–2–1
 For classes with fewer than 3 starters in the class: 6–4
 For classes with 1 starter in the class: 4
 Drivers must complete 75% of the race in order to be classified

2018 Calendar

Champions

External links
 FIA Masters Historic Formula One Championship at racingrecords.eu

References

 
2013 establishments in Europe
Formula One
Fédération Internationale de l'Automobile
Formula racing series